Philip Antony Kruse (born 13 May 1949) is a Norwegian orchestra leader, composer, arranger, producer, text writer, and musician (trumpet and vocals). He is the second son of Colonel Erling O. Kruse (b. 1922) and Eunice Cooklin (b. 1925).

Career
In his early career he joined the group Bendik Singers with his brother Bjørn Kruse. Bendik Singers was a vocal quartet founded by Arne Bendiksen, where the two brothers sang with Anne-Karine Strøm and Ellen Nikolaysen. They won the Norwegian Melodi Grand Prix twice. In addition, Kruse won the Norwegian Melodi Grand Prix three times as a text writer. As producer of the album Match with Wenche Hallan and Jan Høiland, he won the Spellemannprisen in 1976.

He has written about 2,000 melodies and texts for artists like Tommy Körberg, Anita Hegerland, Inger Lise Rypdal, Anne-Karine Strøm and George Keller, and has written the music to TV serials like Amalies jul, Huset med det rare i and Puslespill for NRK. He has produced about 300 music records, including Øivind Blunck's Reidar, Viggo Sandvik's Fisking i Valdres, Trond-Viggo Torgersen's Tramp på en smurf and Vidar Sandbeck's Ballade. As orchestral leader he has contributed to many NRK radio and television productions. He has been on tour with Bjørn Eidsvåg, Sigmund Groven, Ellen Nikolaysen, Kari-Ann Grønnsund, Frode Thingnæs and Vidar Lønn-Arnesen. Lately he has led his own bigband, Philip Kruse BigBand.

Kruse worked with Arne Bendiksen's record company in 1971 to 1979 before he got together with Frode Thingnæs and started Frost Music A/S in 1979. He led this music publishing company until it was sold to EMI in 1999. He was chairman of GramArt and is the chairman of the main jury of the Edvard price given by TONO and director of the Norsk Musikkfond. In 1997 he received the Oslo City Culture Grant. In 2011, he became chairman of the board of NMFF (Norwegian Music Publisher Association) and board member of TONO.

Bibliography
Philip A. Kruse (2011): Musikkforlaget : fra copyright til cash (in Norwegian)

Discography

1974: Bendik Singers (Triola), with Bendik Singers
1978: Norges Største Sjokk Å Lade Plate (Flower), with Einar Hagerup

References

1949 births
20th-century Norwegian trumpeters
21st-century Norwegian trumpeters
Living people
Melodi Grand Prix contestants
Musicians from Oslo
Norwegian composers
Norwegian male composers
Norwegian conductors (music)
Male conductors (music)
Eurovision Song Contest entrants of 1973
Eurovision Song Contest entrants for Norway
Norwegian jazz trumpeters
Male trumpeters
Norwegian male singers
Norwegian record producers
Spellemannprisen winners
20th-century conductors (music)
21st-century conductors (music)
20th-century Norwegian male musicians
21st-century Norwegian male musicians
Male jazz musicians